Dossali Tehsil is a subdivision located in North Waziristan district, Khyber Pakhtunkhwa, Pakistan. The population is 39,821 according to the 2017 census.

Notable people 
 Mir Kalam Wazir

See also 
 List of tehsils of Khyber Pakhtunkhwa

References 

Tehsils of Khyber Pakhtunkhwa
Populated places in North Waziristan